Bahadar Khan is a Pakistani politician who had been a member of the Provincial Assembly of Khyber Pakhtunkhwa from August 2018 till January 2023.
He was also member of provincial assembly of Khyber Pakhtunkhwa in 1993-1996 and 1997-1999 from Lower Dir.
He is Currently the district president of Awami National Party Lower Dir.

Political career

He was elected to the Provincial Assembly of Khyber Pakhtunkhwa as a candidate of Awami National Party from Constituency PK-16 (Lower Dir-IV) in 2018 Pakistani general election.

References

Living people
Awami National Party MPAs (Khyber Pakhtunkhwa)
Year of birth missing (living people)